The 2022–23 Aston Villa W.F.C. season is the club's 27th season under their Aston Villa affiliation, the organisation's 49th overall season in existence and their third season in the Women's Super League, the highest level of the football pyramid. Along with competing in the WSL, the club will also contest two domestic cup competitions: the FA Cup and the League Cup.

Squad

Preseason

Women's Super League

Results summary

Results by matchday

Results

League table

Women's FA Cup 

As a member of the first tier, Aston Villa entered the FA Cup in the fourth round proper.

FA Women's League Cup

Group stage

Knockout stage

Squad statistics

Appearances 

Starting appearances are listed first, followed by substitute appearances after the + symbol where applicable.

|-
|colspan="12"|Players away from the club on loan:

|-
|colspan="12"|Players who appeared for the club but left during the season:

|}

Transfers

Transfers in

Loans in

Transfers out

Loans out

References 

Aston Villa W.F.C. seasons
Aston Villa